Quentin Meillassoux (born 
26 October 1967) is a French philosopher. He teaches at the Université Paris 1 Panthéon-Sorbonne.

Biography
Quentin Meillassoux is the son of the anthropologist Claude Meillassoux. He is a former student of the philosophers  and Alain Badiou. He is married to the novelist and philosopher Gwenaëlle Aubry.

Philosophical work 

Meillassoux's first book is After Finitude (Après la finitude, 2006). Alain Badiou, Meillassoux's former teacher, wrote the foreword. Badiou describes the work as introducing a new possibility for philosophy which is different from Immanuel Kant's three alternatives of criticism, skepticism, and dogmatism. The book was translated into English by Ray Brassier. Meillassoux is associated with the speculative realism movement.

In this book, Meillassoux argues that post-Kantian philosophy is dominated by what he calls "correlationism", the theory that humans cannot exist without the world nor the world without humans. In Meillassoux's view, this theory allows philosophy to avoid the problem of how to describe the world as it really is independent of human knowledge. He terms this reality independent of human knowledge as the "ancestral" realm. Following the commitment to mathematics of his mentor Alain Badiou, Meillassoux claims that mathematics describes the primary qualities of things as opposed to their secondary qualities shown by perception.

Meillassoux argues that in place of the agnostic scepticism about the reality of cause and effect, there should be a radical certainty that there is no causality at all. Following the rejection of causality, Meillassoux says that it is absolutely necessary that the laws of nature be contingent. The world is a kind of hyper-chaos in which the principle of sufficient reason is not necessary although Meillassoux says that the principle of non-contradiction is necessary.

For these reasons, Meillassoux rejects Kant's Copernican Revolution in philosophy. Since Kant makes the world dependent on the conditions by which humans observe it, Meillassoux accuses Kant of a "Ptolemaic Counter-Revolution." Meillassoux clarified and revised some of the views published in After Finitude during his lectures at the Free University of Berlin in 2012.

Several of Meillassoux's articles have appeared in English via the British philosophical journal Collapse, helping to spark interest in his work in the Anglophone world. His unpublished dissertation L'inexistence divine (1997) is noted in After Finitude to be "forthcoming" in book form; as of 2021, it had not yet been published. In Parrhesia, in 2016, an excerpt from Meillassoux's dissertation was translated by Nathan Brown, who noted in his introduction that "what is striking about the document... is the marked difference of its rhetorical strategies, its order of reasons, and its philosophical style" from After Finitude, counter to the general view that the latter merely constituted "a partial précis" of L'inexistence divine; he notes further that the dissertation presents a "very different articulation of the Principle of Factiality" from that in After Finitude.

In September 2011, Meillassoux's book on Stéphane Mallarmé was published in France under the title Le nombre et la sirène. Un déchiffrage du coup de dés de Mallarmé. In this second book, he offers a detailed reading of Mallarmé's famous poem "Un coup de dés jamais n'abolira le hasard" ("A Throw of the Dice Will Never Abolish Chance"), in which he finds a numerical code at work in the text.

Bibliography

Books
After Finitude: An Essay on the Necessity of Contingency, trans. Ray Brassier (Continuum, 2008). ISBN 978-2-02109-215-8
The Number and the Siren: A Decipherment of Mallarme's Coup De Des (Urbanomic, 2012). ISBN 978-0-98321-692-6
Time Without Becoming, edited by Anna Longo (Mimesis International, 2014). ISBN 978-8-85752-386-6
Science Fiction and Extro-Science Fiction, trans. Alyosha Edlebi (Univocal, 2015). ISBN 978-1-937561-48-2

Articles
"Potentiality and Virtuality," in Collapse, vol. II: Speculative Realism.
"Subtraction and Contraction: Deleuze, Immanence and Matter and Memory," in Collapse, vol. III: Unknown Deleuze.
"Spectral Dilemma," in Collapse, vol. IV: Concept Horror.

Notes

Further reading
Pierre-Alexandre Fradet, « Sortir du cercle corrélationnel : un examen critique de la tentative de Quentin Meillassoux », Cahiers Critiques de philosophie, num. 19, dec. 2017, p. 103-119, online : https://www.academia.edu/34706673/_Sortir_du_cercle_corr%C3%A9lationnel_un_examen_critique_de_la_tentative_de_Quentin_Meillassoux_publi%C3%A9_dans_le_dossier_Le_r%C3%A9alisme_sp%C3%A9culation_probl%C3%A8mes_et_enjeux_coordonn%C3%A9_par_A._Longo_Cahiers_Critiques_de_philosophie_no_19_d%C3%A9cembre_2017_p._103-119
Pierre-Alexandre Fradet and Tristan Garcia (eds.), issue "Réalisme spéculatif", in Spirale, no 255, winter 2016—introduction here : "https://www.academia.edu/20381265/With_Tristan_Garcia_Petit_panorama_du_réalisme_spéculatif_in_Spirale_num._255_winter_2016_p._27-30_online_http_magazine-spirale.com_dossier-magazine_petit-panorama-du-realisme-speculatif
Olivier Ducharme et Pierre-Alexandre Fradet, Une vie sans bon sens. Regard philosophique sur Pierre Perrault (dialogue between Perrault, Nietzsche, Henry, Bourdieu, Meillassoux), foreword by Jean-Daniel Lafond, Montréal, Éditions Nota bene, coll. "Philosophie continentale", 2016, 210 p.
Harman, Graham. Quentin Meillassoux: Philosophy in the Making. Edinburgh: Edinburgh University Press, 2011.
Watkin, Christopher. Difficult Atheism: Post-Theological Thinking in Alain Badiou, Jean-Luc Nancy and Quentin Meillassoux. Edinburgh: Edinburgh University Press, paperback: March 2013; hardback: 2011.
Ennis, Paul. Continental Realism. Winchester: Zero Books, 2011.
 Edouard Simca, "Recension: Q. Meillassoux, Après la finitude: Essai sur la nécessité de la contingence, Paris, Seuil, 2006"
Michel Bitbol. Maintenant la finitude: Peut-on penser l'absolu?. Paris, Flammarion, 2019.

External links
« Deuil à venir, dieu à venir », Critique, janvier-février 2006, no 704-705 (revised edition, Éditions Ionas, 2016).
« Potentialité et virtualité », Failles 2, Printemps 2006 (revised edition, Éditions Ionas, 2016).
 Recording of Meillassoux's 2007 lecture in English at the Speculative Realism Conference at Goldsmiths, University of London
 Conferences by Meillassoux (in French)
 Speculative Heresy blog resources page, which contains articles by Meillassoux

1967 births
21st-century French essayists
21st-century French male writers
21st-century French philosophers
Action theorists
Continental philosophers
Deleuze scholars
École Normale Supérieure alumni
Academic staff of the École Normale Supérieure
Epistemologists
Existentialists
Academic staff of the Free University of Berlin
French logicians
French male essayists
French male non-fiction writers
Hermeneutists
Kant scholars
Living people
Lycée Louis-le-Grand alumni
Materialists
Metaphysical realism
Metaphysicians
Ontologists
Phenomenologists
Philosophers of logic
Philosophers of mathematics
Philosophers of time
Philosophical realism
Philosophy academics
Philosophy writers